Jacquinia arborea is a species of flowering plant, a tree in the family Primulaceae. Common names for this species is torchwood, azucares, barbasco, and braceletwood.

The species is native to Aruba, Dominican Republic, Honduras, Jamaica, Mexico, Netherlands Antilles, Puerto Rico, Trinidad-Tobago, and Venezuela.

References 

Primulaceae